Jérôme Golmard (9 September 1973 – 31 July 2017) was a French tennis player.

The left-hander reached a career-high singles ranking of World No. 22 in April 1999, winning 2 singles titles and reaching the semifinals of Monte Carlo in 1999. Golmard finished his career with over $2.2 million in prize money. Among the many notable players he beat on the ATP Tour are former World No. 1s Andre Agassi, Jim Courier, Gustavo Kuerten, Juan Carlos Ferrero, Marcelo Ríos and Carlos Moyá, as well as Grand Slam champions Richard Krajicek, Goran Ivanišević, Albert Costa, Gastón Gaudio, Thomas Johansson and Michael Chang.

He announced in 2014 that he was diagnosed with motor neuron disease, which causes muscle paralysis, and died of the disease on 31 July 2017.

After tennis
Golmard was diagnosed with motor neurone disease in 2014 and died on 31 July 2017, at the age of 43.

ATP career finals

Singles: 4 (2 titles, 2 runners-up)

Doubles: 1 (1 runner-up)

ATP Challenger and ITF Futures finals

Singles: 12 (7–5)

Doubles: 4 (1–3)

Performance timeline

Singles

References

External links
 
 
 

1973 births
2017 deaths
Sportspeople from Dijon
French male tennis players
Neurological disease deaths in France
Deaths from motor neuron disease
20th-century French people
21st-century French people